All That Skate is a figure skating show produced by All That Sports (AT Sports), a sports agency based on Seoul, South Korea set up by 2010 Winter Olympic champion Kim Yuna and her mother Park Mi-hee.

2019 All That Skate
The All That Skate 2019 was held at the Olympic Park KSPO Dome in Seoul, South Korea on June 6~8. The main theme of the ice show was “Move Me” meaning that it will make people “move” with global world champion, rising skaters who will touch the fan's heart.

The Cast for All That Skate 2019
 KIM Yelim
 PARK Soyoun
 LEE Haein
 LIM Eunsoo
 CHOI Dabin
 Nathan CHEN
 Shoma UNO
 Javier Fernández
 LEE Junehyoung
 Wenjing SUI & Cong HAN
 Vanessa JAMES & Morgan CIPRÈS
 Gabriella PAPADAKIS & Guillaume CIZERON
 KIM Yuna

Programs

ACT 1

 OPENING ｜Movement
 KIM Yelim, LEE Haein, PARK Soyoun, CHOI Dabin ｜ Morning Passages
 LEE Junehyong ｜ Ferinelli Il Castrato
 Gabriella PAPADAKIS & Guillaume CIZERON ｜ Oblivion by Astor Piazzolla
 Nathan CHEN ｜Nemesis by Benjamin Clementine
 LIM Eunsoo ｜ Make Me Feel by Janelle Monáe
 Vanessa JAMES & Morgan CIPRÈS ｜ Michael Jackson Medley
 KIM Yelim ｜ One Day I'll Fly Away (from Moulin Rouge OST)
 Shoma UNO ｜ Great Spirit by Armin van Buuren and Vini Vici 
 Wenjing SUI & Cong HAN ｜ Swift Sword (from the Hero soundtrack) by Tan Dun
 LEE Haein ｜Never Enough (from The Greatest Showman OST) by Loren Allred
 Javier Fernández ｜ Prometo (Promise) by Pablo Alborán 
 Gabriella PAPADAKIS & Guillaume CIZERON/Vanessa JAMES & Morgan CIPRÈS ｜ Gypsy Nocturne
 KIM Yuna ｜ Variations on Dark Eyes

ACT 2

 Nathan CHEN, Javier Fernández, Shoma UNO,  LEE Junehyoung｜ Thunder
 PARK Soyoun ｜ 7 Rings / Problem by Ariana Grande 
 Vanessa JAMES & Morgan CIPRÈS ｜ Someone You Loved  by Lewis Capaldi
 LIM Eunsoo ｜ A Star Is Born
 CHOI Dabin ｜ BigSpender
 Shoma UNO ｜ Time After Time by Harry Connick Jr. 
 KIM Yuna ｜ Issues
 Javier Fernández ｜ Black Betty by Ram Jam 
 Wenjing SUI & Cong HAN ｜ Run by Leona Lewis
 Nathan CHEN ｜Next to Me by Otto Knows 
 Gabriella PAPADAKIS & Guillaume CIZERON ｜ Power Over Me
 FINALE ｜ Sing Sing Sing
 CURTAIN CALL ｜
   GUEST | 6th-7th Mamamoo

2018 All That Skate

The SK Telecom All That Skate 2018 was held at the Mokdong Ice Rink in Seoul, South Korea on May 20~22. With the passionate support at the 2018 Pyeongchang Winter Olympics and gratitude to the figure skating fans, the theme of the ice show is “This is for you”.

The Cast for SK Telecom All That Skate 2018

 Kaetlyn OSMOND
 Da-Bin CHOI
 PARK So-Youn
 LIM Eun-Soo
 YOU Young
 Ye-Lim KIM
 Stéphane LAMBIEL 
 Patrick CHAN  
 Jeffrey BUTTLE
 LEE June-Hyoung
 Meagan DUHAMEL & Eric RADFORD
 Tessa VIRTUE & Scott MOIR
 Gabriella PAPADAKIS & Guillaume CIZERON
 KIM Yuna

Programs

ACT 1
 OPENING ｜ Jupiter, the Bringer of Jollity by Gustav Holst
 KIM Ye-Lim ｜ Romeo and Juliet Soundtrack
 PARK So-Youn ｜ This Is Me (from The Greatest Showman OST)
 Patrick CHAN ｜ Lovers in a Dangerous Time by Barenaked Ladies
 Meagan DUHAMEL & Eric RADFORD ｜ Be Mine by Ofenbach
 Stéphane LAMBIEL ｜ Read All About It by Emeli Sandé
 CHOI Da-Bin ｜ The Godfather Soundtrack
 Tessa VIRTUE & Scott MOIR ｜ You Rock My World by Michael Jackson
 Jeffrey BUTTLE ｜ For Forever by Ben Platt
 Kaetlyn OSMOND ｜ Lost by Anouk
 Gabriella PAPADAKIS & Guillaume CIZERON ｜ Gravity by John Mayer
 KIM Yuna ｜ House of Woodcock by Jonny Greenwood (from Phantom Thread OST)

ACT 2
 OPENING
 GUEST ｜ (20th, 22nd) Odissea + Ave Maria by Forte di Quattro (The Winning Team of Korean TV Show Phantom Singer, 2016.)
 GUEST ｜ (21st) In Un'Altra Vita + Sweet Dreams by Forestella (The Winning Team of Korean TV Show Phantom Singer, 2017.)
 YOU Young ｜ Chicago Soundtrack
 LEE June-Hyoung ｜ Rinascero by Erwin Schrott
 LIM Eun-Soo ｜ Havana by Camila Cabello (ft. Yough Thug)
 Jeffrey BUTTLE ｜ Gotta Get Thru This by Daniel Bedingfield
 Meagan DUHAMEL & Eric RADFORD ｜ Sign of the Times by Harry Styles
 Patrick CHAN ｜ Hallelujah by Jeff Buckley
 Kaetlyn Osmond ｜ Too Darn Hot by Ella Fitzgerald
 Gabriella PAPADAKIS & Guillaume CIZERON ｜ Shape of You + Thinking Out Loud by Ed Sheeran
 CHOI Da-Bin ｜ Sparkling Diamonds (from Moulin Rouge! OST)
 Stéphane LAMBIEL ｜ Slave to the Music by James Morrison
 Tessa VIRTUE & Scott MOIR ｜ Moulin Rouge! Soundtrack
 FINALE ｜ God Only Knows by Joss Stone
 CURTAIN CALL ｜ 2U by David Guetta (ft. Justin Bieber)

2016 All That Skate

The All That Skate 2016 was held at the Mokdong Ice Rink in Seoul, South Korea on June 4~6. The theme of the ice show was “The Dream”.

The Cast for All That Skate 2016

 Ashley WAGNER
 Elena RADIONOVA
 PARK So-Youn
 YOU Young
 LIM Eun-Soo
 AN So-Hyun
 Denis TEN
 Misha GE
 KIM Jin-Seo
 LEE June-Hyoung
 Aliona SAVCHENKO & Bruno MASSOT
 Anna CAPPELLINI & Luca LANOTTE
 Rebeka KIM & Kirill MINOV

Programs

ACT 1
 OPENING - Overture by Michael Kamen
 AN So-Hyun - Stone Cold by Demi Lovato
 Rebeka KIM & Kirill MINOV - Uptown Funk by Mark Ronson
 Denis TEN - Lose Yourself (Remix) by Eminem
 Elena RADIONOVA - Worth It by Fifth Harmony
 Aliona SAVCHENKO & Bruno MASSOT - Mozart Serenade in G Major Medley by Various Artist
 June-Hyoung LEE -  눈먼사랑 by 앙상블 시나위
 Ashley WAGNER - Dangerous Woman by Ariana Grande
 Misha GE - 좋더라 (I'm Young) by Winner
 Anna CAPPELLINI & Luca LANOTTE - Fireflies by Leona Lewis
 So-Youn PARK - Amazing Grace by Hayley Westenra

ACT 2
 OPENING - Mr. Mystery & 봄이 온다면 by Ye-Eun AN (K-pop Star 5, Runner-up)
 Jin-Seo KIM - Can't Take My Eyes Off You by John Lloyd Young & Juicy Wiggle by Redfoo
 Eun-Soo LIM - Let's Have a Kiki by Glee Cast
 Misha GE - Bang Bang Bang by Big Bang
 Young YOU - Puttin' On the Ritz by Robbie Williams
 Anna CAPPELLINI & Luca LANOTTE - La Cumparsita by Matos Rodriguez
 Elena RADIONOVA - Imagine by Emeli Sande
 WOMEN GROUP - Cheer Up by Twice
 Aliona SAVCHENKO & Bruno MASSOT - That Man by Caro Emerald
 Denis TEN - Made To Love by John Legend
 Ashley WAGNER - Hip Hip Chin Chin by Club des Belugas
 FINALE - Kick Ass (We Are Young) by Mika
 CURTAIN CALL - Tonight by Spica

2014 All That Skate

The Samsung Galaxy★Smart Aircon All That Skate 2014 was held at Olympic Gymnastics Arena in Seoul, South Korea on May 4~6. The theme of the ice show was “Adios Gracias”, marking the end of Yuna Kim's competitive figure skating career.

The Cast for Samsung Galaxy★Smart Aircon All That Skate 2014

 Kim Yuna
 Shae-Lynn Bourne
 Park So-youn
 Kim Hae-jin
 Alexei Yagudin
 Stéphane Lambiel
 Denis Ten
 Yan Han
 Kim Jin-seo
 Tatiana Volosozhar & Maxim Trankov
  Aliona Savchenko & Bruno Massot
  Rebeka Kim & Kirill Minov

Programs

ACT 1
 OPENING - "Frozen" by Christophe Beck
 Rebeka Kim & Kirill Minov - "Sheherazade" by Nikolai Rimsky-Korsakov
 Kim Hae-jin - "Ready to Fly" by Amy Pearson
 Yan Han - "The Impossible Dream" by Mitch Leigh and Joe Darion
 Aliona Savchenko & Bruno Massot - "Happy" by Pharrell Williams
 Park So-youn - "I Dreamed a Dream" by Idina Menzel
 Denis Ten -  "Mi Mancherai" by Josh Groban
 Shae-Lynn Bourne - "Bom Bom" by Sam and the Womp
 Stéphane Lambiel - "The Water" by Hurts
 Tatiana Volosozhar & Maxim Trankov - "Somebody to Die For" by Hurts
 Alexei Yagudin - "Winter" by Bond
 Kim Yuna - "Send in the Clowns" by Stephen Sondheim

ACT 2
 Yan Han - "The Blue Danube" by Johann Strauss II
 Park So-youn - "The Swan" by Camille Saint-Saëns
 Aliona Savchenko & Bruno Massot - "You Don't Bring Me Flowers" by Neil Diamond and Barbra Streisand
 Kim Jin-seo - "Growl" by Exo
 Alexei Yagudin - "Oblivion" by Ástor Piazzolla
 Shae-Lynn Bourne - "Firedance" by Bill Whelan
 Denis Ten - "Sing, Sing, Sing" by Louis Prima
 Tatiana Volosozhar & Maxim Trankov - "Piano Concerto No.2 Op.18 in C minor mvt.2" by Sergei Rachmaninoff
 Stéphane Lambiel - "Piano Concerto in A minor, Op.16" by Edvard Grieg
 Kim Yuna - "Nessun Dorma" by Giacomo Puccini
 FINALE - "Time to Say Goodbye" by Kang Hye-jung, soprano and Jung Eui-geun, tenor
 CURTAIN CALL - "Glad You Came" by Glee Cast

2013 All That Skate

The Samsung Galaxy★Smart Aircon All That Skate 2013 was held at Olympic Gymnastics Arena in Seoul, South Korea on June 21~23. The concept of the ice show contains the message of the original “Les Miserables”-love and forgiveness, the meaning of hope and salvation, consolation to those people who are tired of living, and encouragement to all who are challenging in this era.

The Cast for Samsung Galaxy★Smart Aircon All That Skate 2013

 Yuna KIM
 Joannie ROCHETTE
 Ashley WAGNER
 Haejin KIM
 Kurt BROWNING
 Stéphane LAMBIEL
 Javier FERNÁNDEZ
 Jinseo KIM
 Aliona SAVCHENKO & Robin SZOLKOWY
 Tatiana VOLOSOZHAR & Maxim TRANKOV
 Vladimir BESEDIN & Oleksiy POLISHCHUK
 Fiona ZALDUA & Dmitry SUKHANOV

Programs

ACT 1
 OPENING - Les Misérables by Claude-Michel Schönberg
 Look Down
 I Dreamed a Dream
 Haejin KIM - The Umbrellas of Cherbourg by Michel Legrand
 Fiona ZALDUA & Dmitry SUKHANOV - Depeche Mode
 Ashley WAGNER - Young & Beautiful by Lana Del Rey
 Vladimir BESEDIN & Oleksiy POLISHCHUK - Sport Games by Various Artists
 Javier FERNÁNDEZ - Charlie Chaplin Medley
 Aliona SAVCHENKO & Robin SZOLKOWY - Nella Fantasia by Ennio Morricone
 Joannie ROCHETTE - Is It a Crime by Sade
 Stéphane LAMBIEL - One (from A Chorus Line) by Marvin Hamlisch
 Tatiana VOLOSOZHAR & Maxim TRANKOV - Nocturne by Secret Garden
 Kurt BROWNING - Singing in the Rain by Gene Kelly
 Yuna KIM - Imagine by Avril Lavigne

ACT 2
 Vladimir BESEDIN & Oleksiy POLISHCHUK - Master of the House (from Les Misérables) by Claude-Michel Schönberg
 Jinseo KIM - The Mask O.S.T. by Randy Edelman
 Fiona ZALDUA & Dmitry SUKHANOV - Snow White and the Huntsman O.S.T. by James Newton Howard
 Joannie ROCHETTE - That Man by Caro Emerald
 Kurt BROWNING - Who's Got the Pain by Gwen Verdon & Bob Fosse
 Tatiana VOLOSOZHAR & Maxim TRANKOV - Skyfall by Adele
 Ashley WAGNER - Sweet Dreams by Eurythmics
 Javier FERNÁNDEZ - Aerobic Class
 Aliona SAVCHENKO & Robin SZOLKOWY - Suit & Tie by Justin Timberlake (feat. Jay-Z)
 Stéphane LAMBIEL - Run by Leona Lewis
 Yuna KIM - Les Misérables by Claude-Michel Schönberg
 FINALE - Les Misérables by Claude-Michel Schönberg
 Castle on a Cloud
 Final Battle
 Do You Hear the People Sing?
 CURTAIN CALL - One Day More (from Les Misérables) by Claude-Michel Schönberg

2012 All That Skate Summer

The All That Skate Summer 2012 was held at Olympic Gymnastics Arena in Seoul, South Korea on August 24~26.

The Cast for All That Skate Summer 2012

 Kim Yuna 
 Joannie Rochette 
 Laura Lepistö 
 Kiira Korpi 
 Alexei Yagudin 
 Stephane Lambiel 
 Patrick Chan 
 Brian Joubert 
 Tatiana Totmianina & Maxim Marinin 
 Aliona Savchenko & Robin Szolkowy 
 Fiona Zaldua & Dmitry Sukhanov 
 Kim Byung-man & Yang Tae-hwa

Programs

ACT 1Opening - Beach Boys MixKiira Korpi - The Girl with the Flaxen Hair by Joshua BellBrian Joubert - L'assasymphonie by Florent MotheAliona Savchenko & Robin Szolkowy - Pink Panther from Pink PantherLaura Lepistö - Rolling in the Deep by AdeleStéphane Lambiel - Violin Concerto in D Major by Pyotr Ilyich TchaikovskyFiona Zaldua & Dmitry Sukhanov - Angels & Demons from the film Angels & Demons (film)Joannie Rochette - For me Formidable by France d'AmourPatrick Chan - Mannish Boy by Muddy WatersByung-man Kim & Tae-hwa Yang - Tarzan Style by Various ArtistsAlexei Yagudin - Libertango by Astor Pantaleon PiazzollaTatiana Totmianina & Maxim Marinin - Exchange of Relatives by Igor KrutoyKim Yuna - All of Me by Michael Bublé

ACT 2Lee Hi - Good Girl by Carrie UnderwoodLaura Lepistö - Dancing by ElisaTatiana Totmianina & Maxim Marinin - Masks by Igor KrutoyPatrick Chan - Till Kingdom Come by ColdplayKiira Korpi - Wide Awake by Katy PerryFiona Zaldua & Dmitry Sukhanov - We Come One by FaithlessBrian Jobuert - Gladiator OST from the film Gladiator (2000 film)Joannie Rochette - Show Me How You Burlesque by Christina AguileraAlexei Yagudin - Burn My Shadow by UnkleAliona Savchenko & Robin Szolkowy - The Boys by Girls' GenerationStéphane Lambiel - Puttin on the Ritz by Irving BerlinKim Yuna - El Tango de Roxanne from the film Moulin Rouge!Park Ji Min - Over the Rainbow by Harold Arlen and E. Y. HarburgFinale - Happy Feet Mix from the film Happy Feet TwoCurtain Call - We Found Love by Rihanna

2012 All That Skate Spring

The E1 All That Skate Spring 2012 was held at Olympic Gymnastics Arena in Seoul, South Korea on May 4–6.

The cast for 2012

 Kim Yuna 
 Carolina Kostner 
 Alissa Czisny  
 Minjeong Kwak  
 Kim Hae-jin  
 Evan Lysacek  
 Patrick Chan  
 Stephane Lambiel  
 Jin Seo Kim  
 Shen Xue & Zhao Hongbo  
 Jamie Salé & David Pelletier  
 Tatiana Volosozhar & Maxim Trankov  
 Vladimir Besedin & Oleksiy Polishchuk

Programs

ACT 1Opening - Avatar MixAlissa Czisny - La vie en rose by John William, Edith PiafKim Hae-jin - Moonlight Sonata by BeethovenTatiana Volosozhar & Maxim Trankov - I Will Always Love You by Whitney HoustonPatrick Chan - Eligie in E Flat Minor by RachmaninoffCarolina Kostner - Hallelujah by Rufus WainwrightJinseo Kim - Fantastic Baby by BigBangStéphane Lambiel - Rigoletto by Giuseppe VerdiShen Xue & Zhao Hongbo - Tian Xia Wu Shuang by Zhang Liang YingEvan Lysacek - The Climb by David HernandezJamie Salé & David Pelletier - Who Wants to Live Forever by QueenKim Yuna - All of Me by Michael Bublé

ACT 2Opening - Special MixVladimir Besedin & Oleksiy Polishchuk - We No Speak Americano by Yolanda be coolMinjeong Kwak - The Truth Is by ChariceAlissa Czisny - I Like the Way You Move by BodyrockersTatiana Volosozhar & Maxim Trankov - Bring Me to Life by EvanescenceStéphane Lambiel - My Body is a Cage by Arcade FireCarolina Kostner - It's Oh So Quiet by BjörkJamie Salé & David Pelletier - Scream by Michael JacksonPatrick Chan - Mannish Boy by Muddy WatersShen Xue & Zhao Hongbo - I'll Be There by Andrea BocelliEvan Lysacek - El Tango de Roxanne by Jose FelicianoKim Yuna - Someone Like You by AdeleVladimir Besedin & Oleksiy Polishchuk - Swan Lake by TchaikovskyFinale - Just Like Paradise by David Lee RothCurtain Call - Without You by David Guetta, Usher

2011 All That Skate Summer

The 2011 All That Skate Summer was held at Olympic Gymnastics Arena in Seoul, South Korea on August 13–15. In addition to the regular cast, Krystal Jung and Lee Dong-whun, the winner of Kim Yu-na's Kiss & Cry, a figure skating reality show hosted by Kim Yuna, performed on the last day of the 2011 ATS Summer.

The cast for 2011

 Kim Yuna 
 Irina Slutskaya 
 Shae-Lynn Bourne  
 Kiira Korpi  
 Sarah Meier  
 Kurt Browning  
 Stéphane Lambiel  
 Patrick Chan  
 Florent Amodio  
 Shen Xue & Zhao Hongbo  
 Jamie Salé & David Pelletier  
 Tessa Virtue & Scott Moir

Programs

ACT 1Opening - Fame, What a FeelingKiira Korpi - You and I by Lady GagaFlorent Amodio - Mess Around by Ray CharlesSarah Meier - Not Myself Tonight by Christina AguileraJamie Salé & David Pelletier - Wild Horses by Rolling StonesKurt Browning - Steppin' Out of My Mind by Geoffrey TaylerIrina Slutskaya - Terra Promessa by Petra BergerPatrick Chan - Take Five by Paul DesmondTessa Virtue & Scott Moir - I want to Hold Your Hand by T.V. CarpioShae-Lynn Bourne - Caruso by Lara FabianStéphane Lambiel - Prelude in G Minor, Op.23, No.5 by RachmaninovShen Xue & Zhao Hongbo - I Believe by Jenkins and Andrea BocelliKim Yuna - Fever by Beyoncé

ACT 2Opening - Running by Sarah BrightmanJamie Salé & David Pelletier - Let's Go Crazy by PrinceKiira Korpi - Cry Me a River by Ella FitzgeraldPatrick Chan - Moondance by Michael BubléShae-Lynn Bourne - Waka Waka by Shakira featuring FreshlygoundFlorent Armodio - Pop Medly by Various ArtistIrina Slutskaya - It's Raining Men by Geri HalliwellStéphane Lambiel - Don't Stop the Music by Jamie CullumShen Xue & Zhao Hongbo - Sweet Dreams by EurythmicsKurt Browning - Honey by Jin Young ParkTessa Virtue & Scott Moir - Samba Medly by Various ArtistKim Yuna - Homage to Korea by Various ArtistKiss & Cry FriendsFinale - Don't Stop Believing by Journey

2011 All That Skate Spring

The 2011 All That Skate Spring was held at the Jamsil Arena in Seoul, South Korea on May 6–8, 2011.

The cast for 2011

 Kim Yuna 
 Kwak Min-jeong 
 Kim Hae-jin  
 Stéphane Lambiel  
 Brian Joubert  
 Jeremy Abott  
 Alissa Czisny  
 Ilia Kulik  
 Ekaterina Gordeeva  
 Shen Xue & Zhao Hongbo  
 Dan Zhang & Hao Zhang  
 Nathalie Péchalat & Fabian Bourzat

Programs

ACT 1Opening - Disco HeavenKim Hae-jin - The Show by LenkaJeremy Abbott - Hometown Glory by AdeleKwak Min-Jeong - Don't Rain on My Parade by Glee CastNathalie Péchalat & Fabian Bourzat - Charlie Chaplin by Charlie ChaplinAlissa Czisny - Dancing with Myself by Nouvelle VagueBrian Joubert - Little Love by AaronZhang Dan & Zhang Hao - Spanish Caravan, Hello I Love You by The DoorsStéphane Lambiel - Don't Stop the Music by Jamie CullumIlia Kulik - Who Wants to Live Forever by David GarrettShen Xue & Zhao Hongbo - Tian Xia Wu Shuang by Zhang Liang YingEkaterina Gordeeva - I Believe in You and Me by Whitney HoustonKim Yuna - Giselle by Adolphe Adam

ACT 2Opening - Born this way by Lady GagaJeremy Abbott - Rhythm of Love by Plain White T'sKwak Min-jeong - Get Right by Jennifer LopezZhang Dan & Zhang Hao - Here I Am by 4맨, 美Brian Joubert - Rise by Safri DuoAlissa Czisny - Moon River by Audrey Hepburn & Henry ManciniNathalie Péchalat & Fabian Bourzat - George of the Jungle by Marc ShaimanIlia Kulik - Love in This Club by UsherEkaterina Gordeeva - Cinema Italiano by Kate HudsonStéphane Lambiel - Bring Me to Life by Katherine JenkinsShen Xue & Zhao Hongbo - Turandot by PucciniKim Yuna - Fever by BeyonceSpecial Guest - Love Alone by miss AFinale - Bad Girl Good Girl, Breathe by miss ACurtain Call - The Time by The Black Eyed Peas

2010 All That Skate LA

The 2010 All That Skate LA was held at the Staples Center in Los Angeles, California, United States on October 2 and 3, 2010.

The cast for 2010

 Kim Yuna 
 Michelle Kwan 
 Ashley Wagner  
 Patrick Chan  
 Stéphane Lambiel  
 Johnny Weir  
 Shen Xue & Zhao Hongbo  
 Aliona Savchenko & Robin Szolkowy 
 Tessa Virtue & Scott Moir  
 Tanith Belbin & Ben Agosto 

Special guest
윤하 (Younha) - Female Singer
B-Boys

Programs

ACT 1Opening - "Get the Party Started" by PinkSkaters IntroductionAshley Wagner - "Ain't No Other Man" by Christina AguileraAliona Savchenko & Robin Szolkowy - "Barbie Girl" by AquaJohnny Weir - "A Comme Amour" by HeartbrokenTanith Belbin & Benjamin Agosto - "If it Kills Me" by Jason MrazPatrick Chan - "Take Five" by Paul DesmondTessa Virtue & Scott Moir- "Schenkst Du Beim Tango Min Dein Herz" by Dajos Bela  & Nights and Days by Waldemar KazaneckiShen Xue & Zhao Hongbo - "Who Wants To Live Forever" by QueenKim Yuna - "Méditation" from Thaïs by Jules Massenet.Michelle Kwan - "No One" by Alicia KeysStéphane Lambiel - "Let the Good Times Roll" by Ray CharlesLadies Performance - "She's So Lovely" by Scouting For GirlsKim Yuna & Michelle Kwan - "Hero" by Mariah Carey

ACT 2B-Boys & Men SkatersTanith Belbin & Benjamin Agosto - "Use Somebody" by Kings of LeonAshley Wagner - "Speechless" by Lady GagaPatrick Chan - "Viva la Vida" by ColdplayAliona Savchenko & Robin Szolkowy - "Nella Fantasia"  by CortesStéphane Lambiel - "William Tell Overture" by Gioachino RossiniShen Xue & Zhao Hongbo - "Turandot" by Giacomo PucciniJohnny Weir - "Poker Face" by Lady GagaMichelle Kwan - "Winter Song" by Sara Bareilles with Ingrid MichaelsonTessa Virtue & Scott Moir - "I Want to Hold Your Hand" by The Beatles, cover by T.V. CarpioKim Yuna - "Bulletproof"  by La RouxSpecial guest - "Just Can't Get Enough" by 윤하 (Younha)Finale - "Dream On" by Aerosmith song by 윤하 (Younha)Curtain Call -  "Tik Tok" by Kesha

2010 All That Skate Summer

The 2010 All That Skate Summer was held at the KINTEX center in Goyang City, Gyeonggi Province, South Korea on July 23–25, 2010. Michelle Kwan joined the show, as well as Sasha Cohen, Stéphane Lambiel, and other skaters. This was the first-ever Kim's ice show hosted by AT Sports.

The main theme of the ice show was "Dreams for Tomorrow", telling the stories of the skaters' dreams and challenges. Kim and Kwan's duet program was performed as a closing gala for the first session. The show was directed by David Wilson.

The cast for 2010

 Kim Yuna 
 Michelle Kwan 
 Kwak Min-jeong 
 Kim Hae-jin 
 Silvia Fontana 
 Sasha Cohen 
 Stéphane Lambiel 
 Brian Joubert 
 Jeremy Abbott 
 John Zimmerman  
 Jamie Salé & David Pelletier 
 Aliona Savchenko & Robin Szolkowy 
 Tanith Belbin & Benjamin Agosto 

Special guest
윤하 (Younha) - Female Singer

Programs

ACT 1OpeningAll Skaters - "Get the Party Started" by PinkJohn Zimmerman - "I'm Gonna Crawl" by Led ZeppelinKwak Min-jeong - "Canon in D Major" by Johann PachelbelJamie Salé & David Pelletier - "Try" by Blue RodeoSilvia Fontana - "Boom Boom Pow" by The Black Eyed PeasJeremy Abbott - "At This Moment" by Michael BubléTanith Belbin & Benjamin Agosto - "If it Kills Me" by Jason MrazBrian Joubert - "Love is All" by Roger GloverSasha Cohen - "Hallelujah" by Jeff BuckleyAliona Savchenko & Robin Szolkowy - "Barbie Girl" by AquaStéphane Lambiel - "Let the Good Times Roll" by Ray CharlesKim Yuna - "Méditation" from Thaïs by Jules Massenet choreography by David WilsonMichelle Kwan - "Primitive" by Annie LennoxClosingKim Yuna & Michelle Kwan - "Hero" by Mariah Carey

ACT 2Opening - "I Have a Dream" by ABBAKim Hae-jin - "You Raise Me Up" by Celtic WomenJeremy Abbott - "Viejos Aires" by Nuevo Tango EnsambleSilvia Fontana & John Zimmerman - "Purple Rain" by PrinceKwak Min-jeong - "Don't Rain on My Parade" soundtrack by GleeBrian Joubert - "Aerodynamic" by Daft PunkTanith Belbin & Benjamin Agosto - "Bleeding Love" by Leona LewisSasha Cohen - "Mein Herr" soundtrack from Cabaret by Liza MinnelliStéphane Lambiel - "William Tell Overture" by Gioachino RossiniJamie Salé & David Pelletier - "Scream" by Michael JacksonMichelle Kwan - "No One" by Alicia KeysAliona Savchenko & Robin Szolkowy - "Gee"  by 소녀시대 (Girls' Generation)Queen Kim Yuna Montage "Gee" channel at YouTubeKim Yuna - "Bulletproof"  by La Roux choreography by David WilsonSpecial guest - "혜성 (Comet)" by 윤하 (Younha)Finale - "Dream On" by Aerosmith song by 윤하 (Younha)Curtain Call'' -  "Tik Tok" by Kesha

References

External links
 All That Skate Official site
 All That Skate Twitter
 All That Skate Blog
 All That Skate YouTube Channel

Ice shows